Zangon Kataf (Tyap: Nietcen-A̱fakan) is a Local Government Area in southern Kaduna State, Nigeria. Its headquarters is in the town of Zonkwa. It is also a name of a town (Tyap: Nietcen-A̱fakan) in the chiefdom of the Atyap. Other towns include: Batadon (Madakiya), Cenkwon (Samaru Kataf), Kamantan, Anchuna Sarki and Kamuru. It has an area of 2,579 km and a population of 318,991 at the 2006 census. The postal code of the area is 802.

Geography

Landscape
In Zangon Kataf LGA, the mountain with the highest peak is Kacecere (Atyecarak) Hill with a height of 1022m and prominence of 98m. Other mountains are: Kankada Hill (1007m), Bako Hill (949m), Madauci Hill (939m), Ashafa Hill (856m), Kabam Hill (814m), and Antang Hill (742m). Bako Hill, however, has the highest prominence of 155m.

Climate

History
Following the creation Kaduna and Katsina from the old North-Central State in 1989, Zangon Kataf LGA was also created from the old Kachia LGA in the same year.

Government and politics

Boundaries
Zangon Kataf Local Government Area shares boundaries with Kachia Local Government Area to the west, Kajuru Local Government Area to the northwest, Kauru Local Government Area to the north and northeast, Kaura Local Government Area to the southeast, Jema'a Local Government Area to the south and Jaba Local Government Area to southwest respectively.

Administrative subdivisions
The Local Government Area is divided into the following administrative subdivides or electoral wards:

Atak Nfang (H. Zaman Dabo)
Gidan Jatau
Ikulu (Bakulu)
Jei (H. Unguwar Gaya)
Kamantan (Anghan)
Kanai (H. Gora)
Madakiya (J. Bata̱don)
Unguwar Rimi (J. Za̱nta̱ra̱kpat)
Zango Urban (T. Nietcen-A̱fakan)
Zonkwa
Zonzon

Demographics

Population
Zangon Kataf Local Government Area according to the March 21, 2006 national population census was put at 318,991. Its population was projected by the National Population Commission of Nigeria and National Bureau of Statistics to be 430,600 by March 21, 2016.

People
The people predominantly belong to the Atyap (Nenzit) Ethno-Linguistic group. These people include: the Bajju, Atyap  proper, Bakulu, Anghan and A̱tyeca̠rak. There are also the Hausa settler elements and other Nigerian peoples settling among the aboriginal people.

Languages
The five indigenous people found in the Local Government Area speak related dialects of a common language, Tyap. The largest of them is Jju, closely followed by Tyap proper, then by Kulu, then by Nghan and then by Tyeca̱rak. However, due to the British colonial influence, Hausa language is also widely spoken.

Culture

Traditional states
There are four chiefdoms in the Local Government Area, namely:
 Akulu chiefdom, headed by the Agwom Akulu, Agwom Yohanna Sidi Kukah. Headquarters at Kamuru.
 Anghan chiefdom, headed by Ngbiar Anghan, Ngbiar Adam Alkali. Headquarters at Fadan Kamantan.
 Atyap chiefdom, headed by the A̱gwatyap (A̱gwam A̱tyap), A̱gwam (Sir) Dominic Gambo Yahaya (KSM). Headquarters at A̠tak Njei, Zangon Kataf.
 Bajju chiefdom, headed by the A̱gwam Ba̱jju, A̱gwam Nuhu Bature A̱chi (OON). Headquarters at Zonkwa.

Cuisine

The major cultural delicacies enjoyed by the people of Zangon Kataf include:

 Ka̱ti/Kpukpei (a semi-liquid food made from coarse corn flour and vegetables)
 Tuk (flour paste) - which can be eaten with any kind of soup one desires.
 Pork and dog meat are also well consumed in this divide of the earth.

The main non-alcoholic drinks synonymous with this region is known as ta̱bwai in the Tyap tongue (kunu in Hausa).

The region has also for long been synonymous for the brewing of the alcoholic drink known as a̱kan in Tyap proper and Tyeca̠rak, dikan in Jju and burukutu in Hausa, although its brewing has been banned in some areas.

Notable people
 Bala Achi, historian, writer
 Katung Aduwak, filmmaker
 Rachel Bakam, entertainer, TV presenter
 Ishaya Bakut, military service
 Isaiah Balat, entrepreneur, politician
 DJ Bally, DJ, music producer, voiceover artist, and TV personality
 Nuhu Bature, paramount ruler
 Musa Bityong, military service
 Harrison Bungwon, engineer, paramount ruler
 Bala Ade Dauke, politician, paramount ruler
 Marok Gandu, heroic figure
 Sunday Marshall Katung, lawyer, politician
 Toure Kazah-Toure, historian, activist, pan-Africanist
 Matthew Hassan Kukah, clergy
 Yohanna Sidi Kukah, paramount ruler
 Zamani Lekwot, military service
 Blessing Liman, military service
 Kyuka Lilymjok, lawyer, writer, academic
 Yohanna Madaki, military service
 Armstrong Magaji , Economist
 Ishaya Shekari, military service
 Dominic Yahaya, paramount ruler
 Andrew Yakubu, engineer
 Paul Samuel Zamani, clergy
 Professor Zakari Buba Magaji , Academician

See also
 List of villages in Kaduna State
 1992 Zangon Kataf crises

References

External links

Local Government Areas in Kaduna State